Aap Beati is a 1976 Hindi film. Produced and directed by Mohan Kumar, the film stars Shashi Kapoor, Hema Malini, Ashok Kumar, Nirupa Roy, Premnath, Aruna Irani, Helen, Asrani, Sujit Kumar and Madan Puri. The film's music is by Laxmikant-Pyarelal.

Plot
The Kapoor family consists of Kishorilal, his wife Laajo, son, Prakash, and daughter, Geeta. Kishorilal and Geeta toil hard to ensure that Prakash gets a good education so he can study in America, return home and repay the loans that the family has taken. Prakash does get to complete his studies, he also travels to America, upgrades, and returns home to be employed as Kishorilal's boss. Then Prakash marries Reena, who comes from a wealthy family and moves in with them. Geeta confides in Reena that she has met a young man, Ranjeet, they love each other and want to marry. The family is overjoyed, but their joys are short-lived when Ranjeet's father, Mayadas asks him to marry the daughter of a wealthy man. When he refuses, he is asked to leave. Reena wants a better lifestyle and convinces Prakash to not only move out, but not have anything to do with his parents and their loans. The onus is once again on Kishorilal and Geeta to repay the loan, but Kishorilal becomes ill and is unable to work. Geeta gets the chance to travel to Paris for three weeks to further her career. When she returns, nothing is the same anymore. Her mother has lost her vision in a fire, her father has died, and a deadbeat Ranjeet considers criminal activity to stay alive.

Cast
 Ashok Kumar as Kishorilal Kapoor
 Shashi Kapoor as Ranjeet
 Hema Malini as Geeta Kapoor
 Nirupa Roy as Laajo Kapoor
 Premnath as Bajrang Bahadur
 Madan Puri as Mayadas
 Sujit Kumar as Prakash Kapoor
 Aruna Irani as Reena Kapoor

Soundtrack

References

External links 
 

1976 films
1970s Hindi-language films
Films scored by Laxmikant–Pyarelal
Films directed by Mohan Kumar